Astemizole (marketed under the brand name Hismanal, developmental code R43512) was a second-generation antihistamine drug that has a long duration of action. Astemizole was discovered by Janssen Pharmaceutica in 1977. It was withdrawn from the market globally in 1999 because of rare but potentially fatal side effects (QTc interval prolongation and related arrhythmias due to hERG channel blockade).

Pharmacology
Astemizole is a histamine H1-receptor antagonist. It has anticholinergic and antipruritic effects.

Astemizole is rapidly absorbed from the gastrointestinal tract and competitively binds to histamine H1 receptor sites in the gastrointestinal tract, uterus, blood vessels, and bronchial muscle. This suppresses the formation of edema and pruritus (caused by histamine).

Despite some earlier reports that astemizole does not cross the blood–brain barrier, several studies have shown high permeability and high binding to protein folds associated with Alzheimer's.

Astemizole may also act on histamine H3 receptors, thereby producing adverse effects.

Astemizole does also act as FIASMA (functional inhibitor of acid sphingomyelinase).

Toxicity
Astemizole has an oral LD50 of approximately 2052 mg/kg (in mice).

References

External links
 Statement on Astemizole from Health Canada

Phenethylamines
Belgian inventions
Benzimidazoles
Fluoroarenes
H1 receptor antagonists
HERG blocker
Janssen Pharmaceutica
Phenol ethers
Piperidines
Withdrawn drugs